This list contains types of games.

Main types

Party games 

 Pong
 Conversation games
 Drinking games
 Guessing games
 Singing games
 Power games

Tabletop games 

 Board games
 Card games
 Dice games
 Miniature games
 Pencil-and-paper games
 Tile-based games
 Role-playing games
 Skill games
 Carrom Boards
 Strategy games
 Deck-building games
 Eurogames
 Amerigame
 Cooperative games

Video games

Technology 
 Arcade games
 Console games
 Handheld console games
 Handheld electronic game
 Mobile games
 PC games

Generation/type 

 Action-adventure games
 Adventure games
 Escape games
 Fighting games
 First person shooter games
 Third person shooter games
 Multiplayer online battle arena games
 Platforming games
 Real-time strategy games
 Rhythm games
 Role-playing video games
 Simulation Games
 Sports games
 Casual games
 Browser games
 Minigames
 Alternate reality games

Others 

 Chance games
 Educational games
 Play-by-mail games
 Play-by-post games
 Multiplayer games
 Mathematical games
 Parlor games
 Pervasive games
 Locative games
 Playground games
 Puzzles
 Lawn games
 Skill games
 Redemption games
 Quizzes
 Wargames
 Word games
 Street games
 Travel games
 Mind games

Types

el:Παιχνίδι#Κατάλογος ειδών παιχνιδιών